The Franklin Banner-Tribune is a small bi-weekly newspaper which circulates in Franklin, the parish seat of St. Mary Parish, Louisiana. As of 2009, it had approximately 3,350 paid subscribers. It is owned by Morgan City Newspapers LLC.

The original newspaper dates to before the American Civil War. From 1950-1965, the Banner-Tribune was edited and published by Robert Angers, who thereafter founded Acadiana Profile magazine. During Angers' tenure, the newspaper was expanded from a weekly to a daily and won a large number of press association awards. Since Allan Von Werder took the helm the paper has struggled and cut back to printing twice a week.

References

External links

Newspapers published in Louisiana